Taşdibek is a village in the Pervari District of Siirt Province in Turkey. The village is populated by Kurds of the Botikan tribe and had a population of 655 in 2021.

The hamlets of Arıca and Çingırak are attached to the village.

History 
The village was part of the Chaldean Catholic Eparchy of Seert of the Chaldean Catholic Church and had a population of 300 Assyrians in 1913.

References 

Villages in Pervari District
Kurdish settlements in Siirt Province
Historic Assyrian communities in Turkey